Brecon, archaically known as Brecknock, is a market town in Powys, mid Wales. In 1841, it had a population of 5,701. The population in 2001 was 7,901, increasing to 8,250 at the 2011 census. Historically it was the county town of Brecknockshire (Breconshire); although its role as such was eclipsed with the formation of the County of Powys, it remains an important local centre. Brecon is the third-largest town in Powys, after Newtown and Ystradgynlais. It lies north of the Brecon Beacons mountain range, but is just within the Brecon Beacons National Park.

History

Early history
The Welsh name, Aberhonddu, means "mouth of the Honddu". It is derived from the River Honddu, which meets the River Usk near the town centre, a short distance away from the River Tarell which enters the Usk a few hundred metres upstream. After the Dark Ages the original Welsh name of the kingdom in whose territory Brecon stands was (in modern orthography) "Brycheiniog", which was later anglicised to Brecknock or Brecon, and probably derives from Brychan, the eponymous founder of the kingdom.

Before the building of the bridge over the Usk, Brecon was one of the few places where the river could be forded. In Roman Britain Y Gaer (Cicucium) was established as a Roman cavalry base for the conquest of Roman Wales and Brecon was first established as a military base.

Norman control
The confluence of the River Honddu and the River Usk made for a valuable defensive position for the Norman castle which overlooks the town, built by Bernard de Neufmarche in the late 11th century. Gerald of Wales came and made some speeches in 1188 to recruit men to go to the Crusades.

Town walls
Brecon's town walls were constructed by Humphrey de Bohun after 1240.  The walls were built of cobble, with four gatehouses and was protected by ten semi-circular bastions.  In 1400 the Welsh prince Owain Glyndŵr rose in rebellion against English rule, and in response in 1404 100 marks was spent by the royal government improving the fortifications to protect Brecon in the event of a Welsh attack. Brecon's walls were largely destroyed during the English Civil War. Today only fragments survive, including some earthworks and parts of one of the gatehouses; these are protected as scheduled monuments.

In Shakespeare's play King Richard III, the Duke of Buckingham is suspected of supporting the Welsh pretender Richmond (the future Henry VII), and declares:
 
O, let me think on Hastings and be goneTo Brecknock, while my fearful head is on!

Priory and cathedral

A Priory was dissolved in 1538, and Brecon's Dominican Friary of St Nicholas was suppressed in August of the same year. The role of cathedral is a fairly recent one, and was bestowed upon the church in 1923 with the formation of the Diocese of Swansea and Brecon from what was previously the archdeaconry of Brecon—a part of the Diocese of St David's.

St. Mary's Church
Saint Mary's Church began as a chapel of ease to the priory but most of the building is dated to later medieval times. The tower has eight bells which have been rung since 1750, the heaviest of which weighs . In March 2007 the bells were removed from the church tower for refurbishment. The church is a Grade II* listed building.

St. David's Church, Llanfaes

The Church of St. David, referred to locally as Llanfaes Church, was probably founded in the early sixteenth century. The first Parish Priest, Maurice Thomas, was installed there by John Blaxton, Archdeacon of Brecon in 1555. The name is derived from the Welsh – Llandewi yn y Maes – which translates as St. David's in the Field.

Plough Lane Chapel, Lion Street
Plough Lane Chapel, also known as Plough United Reformed Church, is a Grade II* listed building. The present building dates back to 1841 and was re-modelled by Owen Morris Roberts.

St Michael's Church
After the Reformation, some Breconshire families such as the Havards, the Gunters and the Powells persisted with Catholicism despite its suppression. In the 18th Century a Catholic Mass house in Watergate was active, and Rev John Williams was the local Catholic priest from 1788 to 1815. The present parish priest is Rev Father Jimmy Sebastian Pulickakunnel MCBS since 2012. The Watergate house was sold in 1805, becoming the current Watergate Baptist Chapel, and property purchased as the priest's residence and a chapel between Wheat Street and the current St Michael Street, including the "Three Cocks Inn"; about this time Catholic parish records began again. The normal round of bishop's visitations and confirmations resumed in the 1830s. In 1832 most civil liberties were restored to Catholics and they became able to practise their faith more openly. A simple Gothic church, dedicated to St Michael and designed by Charles Hansom, was built in 1851 at a cost of £1,000.

Military town
The east end of town has two military establishments:
 Dering Lines, home to the Infantry Battle School (formerly Infantry Training Centre Wales)
 The Barracks, Brecon, home to 160th (Wales) Brigade.
Approximately  to the west of Brecon is Sennybridge Training Area, an important training facility for the British Army.

Governance

Brecon Town Council, based at Brecon Guildhall, represents the town at the local level, with up to fifteen councillors elected from four wards: St David's, St Mary's, St John's East and St John's West. The town elects a mayor annually. In May 2018 it elected its first mixed race mayor, local hotelier Emmanuel (Manny) Trailor, who is a town councillor for St John's West.

Until 2022 there were three county council electoral wards in the town (St David Within, St John and St Mary) which each elected a county councillor to Powys County Council. All three are represented by Labour Party councillors, the St Mary ward being gained from the Conservatives in a November 2019 by-election.

In 2018 a review of electoral arrangements proposed that all three Brecon county wards be merged into a single, three councillor ward.

Education

Brecon has primary schools, with a secondary school and further education college (Brecon Beacons College) on the northern edge of the town. The secondary school, known as Brecon High School, was formed from separate boys' and girls' grammar schools ('county schools') and Brecon Secondary Modern School, after comprehensive education was introduced into Breconshire in the early 1970s. The town is home to an independent school, Christ College, which was founded in 1541.

Transport

The junction of the east–west A40 (London-Monmouth-Carmarthen-Fishguard) and the north–south A470 (Cardiff-Merthyr Tydfil-Llandudno) is on the east side of Brecon town centre. The nearest airport is Cardiff Airport.

Monmouthshire and Brecon Canal
It then continues to Newport, the towpath being the line of communication and the canal being disjointed by obstructions and road crossings. The canal was built between 1797 and 1812 to link Brecon with Newport and the Severn Estuary. The canalside in Brecon was redeveloped in the 1990s and is now the site of two mooring basins and Theatr Brycheiniog.

Usk bridge

The bridge carries the B4601 across the River Usk. A plaque on a house wall adjacent to the eastern end of the bridge records that the present bridge was built in 1563 to replace a medieval bridge destroyed by floods in 1535. It was repaired in 1772 and widened in 1794 by Thomas Edwards, the son of William Edwards of Eglwysilan. It had stone parapets until the 1970s when the present deck was superimposed on the old structure. The bridge was painted by J.M.W. Turner c.1769.

Former railways
The Neath and Brecon Railway reached Brecon in 1867, terminating at Free Street. By this point, Brecon already had two other railway stations:
Watton – from 1 May 1863 when the Brecon and Merthyr Railway to Merthyr Tydfil was opened for traffic
Mount Street – in September 1864, with Llanidloes by the Mid Wales Railway which linked to the Midland Railway at Talyllyn Junction. The three companies consolidated their stations at a newly rebuilt Free Street Joint Station from 1871 and the station finally closed in 1872

Hereford, Hay and Brecon Railway

The Hereford, Hay and Brecon Railway was opened gradually from Hereford towards Brecon. The first section opened in 1862, with passenger services on the complete line starting on 21 September 1864.
The Midland Railway Company (MR) took over the HH&BR from 1 October 1869, leasing the line by an Act of 30 July 1874 and absorbing the HH&BR in 1876.  The MR was absorbed into the London, Midland and Scottish Railway (LMS) on 1 January 1923.
 
Passenger services to Merthyr ended in 1958, Neath in October 1962 and Newport in December 1962. In 1962 the important line to Hereford closed.  Therefore, Brecon lost all its train services before the 1963 Reshaping of British Railways report (often referred to as the Beeching Axe) was implemented.

Culture
Brecon hosted the National Eisteddfod in 1889.

August sees the annual Brecon Jazz Festival. Concerts are held in both open air and indoor venues, including the town's market hall and the 400-seat Theatr Brycheiniog, which opened in 1997.

October sees the annual 4-day weekend Brecon Baroque Music Festival, organised by leading violinist Rachel Podger.

Idris Davies put "the pink bells of Brecon" in his poem published as XV in Gwalia Deserta (by T. S. Eliot). This was copied in "Quite Early One Morning" by Dylan Thomas, put to music by Pete Seeger as the song "The Bells of Rhymney", then recorded by the Byrds where it became known to millions although by then the Brecon line had gone missing.

Points of interest

Brecon Castle
Brecon Beacons and National Park Visitor Centre (also known as the Mountain Centre)
Brecon Beacons Food Festival
Brecon Cathedral, the seat of the Diocese of Swansea and Brecon
Brecon Jazz Festival
Buckland Coach House & Ice House
Cae Gwernllertai
Christ College, Brecon
Regimental Museum of The Royal Welsh
Theatr Brycheiniog (Brecon Theatre)
Y Gaer

Notable people

See :Category:People from Brecon

 Sibyl de Neufmarché (ca.1100 – after 1143), Countess of Hereford, suo jure Lady of Brecknock
 Gerald of Wales (ca.1146 – ca.1223), a Cambro-Norman priest and historian.
 William de Braose (ca.1197 – 1230), a Marcher lord.
 Dafydd Gam (ca.1380 – 1415), archer, died fighting for Henry V at the Battle of Agincourt
 Edward Stafford, 3rd Duke of Buckingham KG (1478–1521) an English nobleman.
 Hugh Price (ca.1495 – 1574), founder of Jesus College, Oxford
 Admiral Sir William Wynter (ca.1521 – 1589), principal officer of the Council of the Marine
 Henry Vaughan (1621–1695), physician and author, a major Metaphysical poets.
 John Jeffreys (ca.1623 - 1689), landowner and politician, first master of the Royal Hospital Kilmainham 
 Captain Thomas Phillips (late 17th C), slave trader
 Thomas Coke (1747–1814), Mayor of Brecon in 1772 and the first Methodist bishop.
 Sarah Siddons (1755–1831), well known tragedienne actress.
 David Price (1762–1835), orientalist and officer in the East India Company.
 Charles Kemble (1775–1854), actor, younger brother of Sarah Siddons.
 John Evan Thomas FSA (1810–1873), a Welsh sculptor
 Mordecai Jones (1813-1880), businessman, pioneered the South Wales coalfield, Mayor of Brecon in 1854.
 Frances Hoggan (1843–1927), first British woman to receive a doctorate in medicine
 Ernest Howard Griffiths (1851–1932), physicist and academic
 Llewela Davies (1871–1952), pianist and composer
 Dame Olive Wheeler (1886–1963), educationist, psychologist and university lecturer
 Captain Richard Mayberry (1895–1917), World War I flying ace
 Lt Col S. F. Newcombe (1878–1956), Army Officer and associate of T. E. Lawrence.
 Tudor Watkins, Baron Watkins (1903–1983), politician and MP
 John Fullard (1907–1973), tenor singer with the Covent Garden Opera
 George Melly (1926–2007), trad jazz singer, art critic and writer, retreat at Brecon between 1971 and 1999
 Gareth Gwenlan OBE (1937–2016), TV producer, director and executive
 Roger Glover (born 1945), bassist and songwriter with the band Deep Purple
 Jeb Loy Nichols (born ca.1965), musician
 Nia Roberts (born 1972), actress
 Gerard Cousins (born 1974), guitarist, composer and arranger.
 Natasha Marsh (born 1975), soprano singer. 
 Sian Reese-Williams (born 1981), actress

Sport 
 Frederick Bowley (1873–1943), a first-class cricketer for Worcestershire
 Walley Barnes (1920–1975), footballer with 299 club caps and 22 for Wales and a broadcaster.
 Adrian Street (born 1940), a retired Welsh professional wrestler
 Andy Powell (born 1981), Welsh Rugby Union international number eight
 Sam Hobbs (born 1988), rugby union player with Cardiff Blues
 Jessica Allen (born 1989), a Welsh racing cyclist.
 Emma Plewa (born 1990), footballer with 20 caps with Wales women

Town twinning
 Saline, Michigan, United States
 Blaubeuren, Baden-Württemberg, Germany (Blaubeuren is twinned with Brecknockshire, which is an area of Powys, rather than with the town of Brecon.)
 Gouesnou, Brittany, France
 Dhampus, Kaski District, Nepal

References

Bibliography

External links

 
 Brecon Town Council website

 
Towns in Powys
County towns in Wales
Market towns in Wales
Towns with cathedrals in the United Kingdom
River Usk
Former county towns in Wales

sl:HMS Brecon
fi:HMS Brecon